Innes , when used as a given name, is an Anglicisation of the Scottish Gaelic name  (Angus). As a surname, it is derived from the Scottish Clan Innes, and originated in Moray. Notable people include:

Surname

Actors
 George Innes (born 1938), actor
 Laura Innes (born 1959), actress
 Scott Innes (born 1966), author, songwriter, and voice actor

Artists
 Callum Innes (born 1962), abstract painter
 James Dickson Innes (1887–1914), painter

Authors and writers
 Hammond Innes (1914–1998), English author
 Henrietta Rose-Innes (born 1971), novelist
 James Innes (born 1975), English author
 Michael Innes, pseudonym of J. I. M. Stewart

Historians
 Cosmo Innes (1798–1874), historian and antiquary
 Thomas Innes (1662–1744), historian

Law and politicians
 Alfred Mitchell-Innes (1864–1950), diplomat
 Charles Alexander Innes (1874–1959), colonial administrator
 Charles Hiller Innes (1870–1939), Massachusetts politician
 Frederick Innes (1816–1882), politician
 Harry Innes (1752–1816), federal judge
 Hugh Paterson Innes (1870–1931), lawyer and judge
 James Innes (Canadian politician) (1833–1903), journalist and businessman
 James Rose Innes (1855–1942), Chief Justice and politician of the Cape, South Africa
 John Innes (Toronto, Ontario politician) (died 1951), Scottish-Canadian politician in Toronto
 Malcolm Innes of Edingight (1938–2020), Scottish judge, Lord Lyon 1981–2001
 Ted Innes (1925–2010), politician
 Thomas Innes of Learney (1893–1971), Scottish officer of arms, Lord Lyon 1945–1969

Military
 Archibald Clunes Innes (1800–1857), soldier and pastoralist
 James John McLeod Innes (1830–1907), military officer
 Veronica Volkersz (née Innes; 1917–2000), British World War II aviator

Musicians
 Andrew Innes (born 1962), musician
 Gary Innes (born 1980), musician
 Neil Innes (1944–2019), musician

Religion
 John de Innes (c. 1370–1414), bishop
 Reginald Mitchell-Innes (1848–1930), priest
 Robert Innes (born 1959), bishop

Scientists
 Robert T. A. Innes (1861–1933), astronomer
 William T. Innes (1874–1969), writer, ichthyologist and publisher

Sports
 Albert Rose-Innes (1868–1946), South African cricketer
 Bob Innes (New Zealand footballer), New Zealand international football (soccer) player
 Bob Innes (Scottish footballer) (1878–1959), football (soccer) player
 Chris Innes (born 1976), football (soccer) player
 Craig Innes (born 1969), New Zealand rugby footballer
 Gerald Innes (1931–1982), South African cricketer
 Gordon Innes (1910–1992), rugby union and rugby league player
 Mandy Mitchell-Innes (1914–2006), cricketer
 Mark Innes (born 1978), footballer
 Richard Innes (born 1953), cricketer

Other professions
 Euphemia Steele Innes, RRC, DN (1874–1955), Scottish nurse, matron of Leeds General Infirmary and 2nd Northern General Hospital, founded Leeds Nurses' League
 John Innes (philanthropist) (1829–1904), British property developer and philanthropist
 John William Brodie-Innes (1848–1923), occultist

Given name
 Innes Ireland (1930–1993), military officer, engineer, and motor racing driver
 Innes Lloyd (1925–1991), television producer
 Innes Harold Stranger (1879–1936), barrister and politician
 Innes Willox (born 1963), journalist, diplomat, and lobbyist
 Innes Senior (born 2000), professional rugby league footballer

Middle name
 Augusta Innes Withers (1793–1877), illustrator
 James Innes Randolph (1837–1887), American military officer and poet
 William Innes Homer (1929–2012), academic and author

In fiction
 David Innes, fictional character by Edgar Rice Burroughs
 Rachel Innes, fictional character from The Circular Staircase by Mary Roberts Rinehart

References

English-language surnames